Popular, Inc., doing business as Banco Popular in Puerto Rico and the Virgin Islands and as Popular Bank in the mainland United States, is a financial services conglomerate that has operated in Puerto Rico for over 125 years and in the mainland United States for over 52 years.  In recent years, it has expanded into other areas of the Caribbean and Central America. The BPPR in the logo stands for Banco Popular de Puerto Rico, where the bank has its major historical footprint.

Popular, Inc. is the parent company of Banco Popular de Puerto Rico, Popular Bank, E-Loan, and several other companies.

The headquarters of Banco Popular Puerto Rico is in Hato Rey, San Juan.

History

The bank was founded in Puerto Rico in 1893 when the island was still under Spanish administration. It was led in its early stages by Rafael Carrión Sr. and Don Manuel Muñoz Barrios, the latter of which was the company's first president and administrator.

During the 1970s, the company's commercials were very popular on Puerto Rican television: they presented a balding, middle aged man in a white tee shirt, announcing the company in a comic way. The 1970s also saw a giant step in the development of Banco Popular as Puerto Rico's biggest bank, when it bought two-thirds of the Banco de Crédito y Ahorro Ponceño. Through this purchase, Popular entered the credit-card industry.

During the following decades, Banco Popular put great of emphasis on the company's public image. It was during the 1980s, after Rafael Carrion, Sr.'s death, that Richard L. Carrión assumed the role as President of the corporation.

In 1989, the bank introduced a children's savings service with a bear, "Populoso", as its mascot. The Club del Ahorro (or Savings Club) was (and still is) intended to encourage children to open savings accounts and keep track of their money.

1990s
The following decade started with a big development for the bank, when in 1990 it merged with Banco de Ponce, one of the largest banks in Puerto Rico. At this time, Banco Popular's holding company changed its name to BanPonce Corporation.  Popular acquired Banco Roig, one of the main banks in the eastern side of the island, in 1997, entering a geographical market in which it had yet to succeed.

During the late 1990s, the company began to diversify its services thanks to revisions of state laws that allowed banks certain 'privileges' related to different financial services other than banking. These years saw the birth of Popular Auto, Popular Finance, Popular Mortgage, Popular Insurance, Popular Leasing, among others.

During this time, the company created one of its flagship subsidiaries, Popular Securities. It quickly became the investment banking, retail brokerage, and institutional sales arm of Banco Popular. On the retail side, Popular Securities has an extensive network of brokers in Puerto Rico, rivaled only by Swiss giant UBS and more recently by Banco Santander. Popular Securities has additional offices in New York City, San Antonio, Houston, and Chicago.

2000s

Due to its growth in Puerto Rico, and the aggressive expansion in the United States, the company changed its name once again in 2000 to Popular, Inc., a name that goes back to the traditional roots of the corporation and which also reflects the common title in almost all of the subsidiaries of the company.

During this period, the company reorganized itself into three main subsidiary companies: Banco Popular de Puerto Rico, with David Chafey Jr. as president; Popular Bank, with Roberto Herencia as president; and Evertec, with Felix Villamil as president. Richard Carrión remained as president and CEO of the parent company, Popular, Inc.

In the January 24, 2005 issue of Fortune, Popular, Inc. was chosen as one of the 100 Best Companies to Work For.

On April 11, 2005, Popular Bank announced a five-year agreement with the New York Mets under which Popular would operate seven ATMs and display various advertisements at Shea Stadium until it closed in September 2008, and the team moved to the new Citi Field.

Present
 
Popular's world headquarters are located in the San Juan's Hato Rey business district, on a stretch of a thoroughfare commonly known as Milla de Oro ("The Golden Mile") due to the number of banks headquartered in the area. Travelers who fly into the Luis Muñoz Marín International Airport can appreciate Popular's landmark building below.

Between 2010 and 2012, the bank re-branded its mainland branches as Popular Community Bank in an effort to attract more non-Hispanic customers.  The first branches to bear the new name were in the Chicago market followed by those in Southern California and Florida, then New York City and New Jersey.

As of January, 2012, Popular, Inc. still owed $935 million to the US government Troubled Asset Relief Program.

In March 2013, Popular announced it would sell a $568 million portfolio of non-performing loans to a joint venture between Caribbean Property Group and funds affiliated with Perella Weinberg Partners.

In 2014, Popular Community Bank sold many of its mainland United States branches in Central Florida, Illinois and Southern California to cut costs and shore up its reserves against losses caused by foreclosures and the recession in Puerto Rico.  After the sale, Popular Community Bank retained 49 branches in South Florida, New Jersey, and New York.  On September 12, 2014, Harbor Community Bank purchased Popular's branches in Orlando and central Florida.  On November 7, 2014,  Banc of California in Irvine purchased 20 branches of Popular Community Bank in southern California.

In 2018, Popular Community Bank changed its name to Popular Bank (Legal name) and Popular, commercial name.

Stats
 Ranked the 784th Largest Company In The World by Forbes (2006)
 Ranked the 84th Best Company to Work For by Fortune (2005)
 Ranked the Best Consumer Internet Bank in Puerto Rico by Global Finance (2007)
 Has over $65 billion in assets
 Approx. 8,000 employees
 Symbol: BPOP (NASDAQ)

Timeline

1893: A group of local Puerto Rican and Spanish notables founded the Sociedad Anónima de Economías y Préstamos (later Banco Popular de Economías y Préstamos) on 5 October 1893. The founders wanted to create a thrift institution for the island's poor to encourage savings.
1928: First bank in Puerto Rico to offer personal loans without collateral.
1930: Popular acquired the Banco Comercial de Puerto Rico. This bank had begun in 1857 as Banco Español de Puerto Rico and changed its name to Banco de Puerto Rico in 1900.  Then in 1913 it changed its name to Banco Comercial de Puerto Rico.
1938: First bank in Puerto Rico to offer an FHA mortgage loan.
1950: Popular becomes the largest bank in Puerto Rico.
1961: Popular opened a branch in New York City (Bronx) to serve the Puerto Rican community there.
1973: First bank in Puerto Rico to offer combined accounts.
1975: Popular opened a branch in Los Angeles. Although US banks could not branch across state lines, non-US banks could.  The California State Superintendent of Banking declared Puerto Rico "international", allowing Popular to open a branch in reciprocity for the branch Bank of America had opened in Puerto Rico.
1981: Popular started to expand in the Caribbean by establishing a branch in the U.S. Virgin Islands and another in Tortola, British Virgin Islands.
1984: Popular took over the failed Washington National Bank, a locally owned bank catering to the Hispanic community in Chicago. Popular also launched the first automated teller machine network in the island.
1988: Popular is the first bank in Puerto Rico to offer phone-banking.
1990: Popular merged with Banco de Ponce to create the largest bank in Puerto Rico.  The holding company took the name BanPonce. (Banco de Ponce had established an agency in New York that it had converted to a branch in 1961.  At the time of the merger, Banco de Ponce had nine branches in New York to Popular's six.)
1991: Popular acquired the deposits and one branch of New York Capital Bank in upper Manhattan, an unsuccessful attempt to revive the failed Capital National Bank, which had served most of the Dominican small businesses there.
1992: Popular acquired seven branches from the failed American Savings Bank, four branches and their deposits from Bank Leumi Trust Company, and one branch and its deposits from Northside Savings Bank.
1993: Popular became the largest bank in the Virgin Islands when it acquired CoreStates First Pennsylvania Bank's five branches there. Century Anniversary.
1994: Popular bought Pioneer Bank in Chicago and merged it with Popular's existing operations.  Popular also entered New Jersey by buying four branches from the failed Carteret Savings Bank.  It then opened two more branches, to form Banco Popular FSB (a federal savings association).
1995: Popular established the ATH Dominicana ATM network in the Dominican Republic. (ATH stands for "A Toda Hora". i.e., "at all hours".)
1996: Popular bought American Midwest Bank for its two branches in suburban Melrose Park, a Chicago suburb that was drawing Hispanics. In California, Popular created a subsidiary, Banco Popular NA (California), bought Commerce National Bank, and transferred to it the branch that it had established in 1975.
1997: Popular acquired the Seminole Bank branch in Sanford, Florida, and Banco Roig in Puerto Rico.
1998: Popular made Chicago the headquarters for the US Executive Offices of its subsidiary, Popular North America, which took over all its US mainland commercial activities. In the Dominican Republic, Popular took a minority position in Banco Fiduciario, the fourth largest bank, a stake that it later built up to a majority position. Popular entered Costa Rica as it had entered the Dominican Republic, Popular entered Costa Rica in the same way as it had entered the Dominican Republic, i.e., by establishing an ATM network, ATH Costa Rica.
1999: Popular bought First State Bank of Southern California from Korea's Hanil Bank and merged it with Popular (California). In the Chicago area, Popular bought Irving Bank, Water Tower Bank and Aurora National Bank.  Popular also bought Banco Popular, a start-up bank in Orlando, Florida, and Citizens Bank in Houston. In addition, Popular bought the GM Group, entering the processing business.
2000: Popular begins its online banking system
2001: Popular buys three branches in Puerto Rico's central mountain region from BBVA.
2005: Popular completes acquisition of Quaker City Bank, establishing California as the largest region of Popular Bank. Popular also purchases New Jersey's Infinity Mortgage for an undisclosed amount. On August 3, 2005, Popular announced the purchase of E-Loan for an estimated $300 million merger agreement. A month later, on September 21, Popular announced that it would sell Popular Cash Express to ACE Cash Express for $36 million. Popular was ranked as the 691st largest company in the world by Forbes.
2006: Banco Popular North America relocates its California Region headquarters to Anaheim, California headed by Vernon Aguirre. 
2007: Banco Popular North America sells five of six branches in Texas region to Prosperity Bank.
2007: Banco Popular acquires Citibank's retail business in Puerto Rico, including nine branches, as well as the operations in Puerto Rico of broker-dealer Smith Barney, a Citibank subsidiary.
2008: Popular agrees to sell certain assets of Equity One, the U.S. mainland consumer finance operations of Popular Financial Holdings, to American General Finance, a member of American International Group.
2010: Banco Popular acquires competitor Westernbank, after it failed and the Federal Deposit Insurance Corporation seized its deposits. On October 1, 2010, Popular sold 51% Evertec participating to Apollo Management.
2015: Banco Popular acquires the deposits of Doral Bank after regulators declared it insolvent.
2018: Popular Community Bank changed its name to Popular Bank (Legal name) and Popular, commercial name.

Subsidiaries and Services

Puerto Rico
Banco Popular de Puerto Rico
Popular Auto
Popular Securities
Popular Asset Management
Popular Insurance
Plazapop

United States

Popular Bank
Popular Business Banking
Popular Association Banking
Popular Equipment Finance
Popular Direct
Popular Mortgage
Popular Private Client

Virgin Islands
Banco Popular Virgin Islands

Former Subsidiaries
Popular Cash Express (sold to ACE Cash Express on 09/21/2005)

Musical tradition
For its 100th Anniversary celebration, Popular gathered a group of famous Latin-American musicians in an effort to create a musical televised show. After the large success of this venture, the company began to produce annual live Christmas concerts and television specials with various Puerto Rican and international singers and artists. The 1996 version included the future star Shakira. The concerts and specials are aired in local television stations and then released on CDs and DVD, raising money for the company's philanthropic foundation (Fundación Banco Popular) which benefits a variety of non-profit organizations in the island.

The titles of the musicals are:

 1993 - Un Pueblo que Canta (People Who Sing)
 1994 - El Espíritu de un Pueblo (The Spirit of a People)
 1995 - Somos un Sólo Pueblo (We Are One People)
 1996 - Al Compás de un Sentimiento (To the Rhythm of a Feeling)
 1997 - Siempre Piel Canela (Always Brown Skin)
 1998 - Romance del Cumbanchero (Romance of the Cumbanchero)
 1999 - Con la Música por Dentro (With the Music Within)
 2000 - Guitarra Mía: Un Tributo a José Feliciano (My Guitar: A Tribute to José Feliciano)
 2001 - Raíces (Roots)
 2002 - Encuentro (Encounter)
 2003 - Ocho Puertas (Eight Doors)
 2004 - En Mi País (In My Country)
 2005 - Queridos Reyes Magos (Dear Wise Men)
 2006 - Viva Navidad (Viva Christmas)
 2007 - Lo Mejor de Nuestra Música Popular: 15 Años de Éxitos (The Best of Our Popular Music: 15 Years of Hits)
 2008 - Eco (Echo)
 2009 - Palés y la Rumba de Esquina (Palés and the Corner Rumba)
 2010 -  (Salsa: An Homage to El Gran Combo)
 2011 - Sonó, Sonó: Tite Curet (Sounded, It Sounded: Tite Curet)
 2012 - Hecho con Sabor a Puerto Rico (Made with Flavor of Puerto Rico)
 2013 - Música en Tiempos (Music Through Times)
 2014 - Qué Lindo Es Puerto Rico (How Beautiful is Puerto Rico)
 2015 - Cuba y Puerto Rico Son (Puerto Rico and Cuba Son)
 2016 - De Puerto Rico para el Mundo (From Puerto Rico to the World)
 2017 - Nuestra Isla, Nuestro Encanto (Our Island, Our Charm)
 2018 - Más de un Siglo (More than a Century)
 2019 - Tiempos de Aguinaldo (Times of Aguinaldo)
 2020 - Somos música (We Are Music)
 2021 - Ellas, mujeres en la música (Women in music)
Online Discography

Competitors (in Puerto Rico)
 Oriental Financial
 First BanCorp

References

External links

Popular, Inc.
 Official Site

Subsidiaries
 Popular Bank
 E-Loan (Purchased by Popular, Inc 2005)
 Popular Equipment Finance
 Popular Auto
 Popular Mortgage
 Popular Securities
 Popular Insurance
 TicketPop (Ticket Sale service operated by Popular)

Banks of Puerto Rico
Companies listed on the Nasdaq
Banks established in 1893
Companies based in San Juan, Puerto Rico
Companies based in Cook County, Illinois
Puerto Rican brands
Rosemont, Illinois
1893 establishments in Puerto Rico